Krešimir Sunara (born 10 March 1970) is a Croatian retired footballer and later football manager.

References

1970 births
Living people
Sportspeople from Šibenik
Association football midfielders
Croatian footballers
NK Dubrava players
HNK Šibenik players
NK Osijek players
Croatian Football League players
Croatian football managers
NK Hrvatski Dragovoljac managers
NK Solin managers
NK Dugopolje managers
HNK Šibenik managers
NK Zadar managers
Croatian Football League managers